Trackless tram may refer to: 
Autonomous Rail Rapid Transit
A guided bus
 Rubber-tyred tram
 A trolleybus
 An autonomous articulated bus